or  is a Sufi term for the religious ecstasy induced by dhikr (the remembrance of God) or by means of sama, listening to the measured recitation, signing or chanting of spiritual verses or poetry.

See also 
 Wujud

References 

Sufi philosophy